Whale oil is oil obtained from the blubber of whales. Whale oil from the bowhead whale was sometimes known as train oil, which comes from the Dutch word traan ("tear" or "drop").

Sperm oil, a special kind of oil obtained from the head cavities of sperm whales, differs chemically from ordinary whale oil: it is composed mostly of liquid wax. Its properties and applications differ from those of regular whale oil, and it was sold for a higher price.

Source and use
Emerging industrial societies used whale oil in oil lamps and to make soap. In the 20th century it was made into margarine. With the commercial development of the petroleum industry and vegetable oils, the use of whale oils declined considerably from its peak in the 19th century into the 20th century. This is said to have saved whales from extinction. In the 21st century, with most countries having banned whaling, the sale and use of whale oil has practically ceased.

Whale oil was obtained by boiling strips of blubber harvested from whales. The removal is known as flensing and the boiling process was called trying out. The boiling was carried out on land in the case of whales caught close to shore or beached. On longer deep-sea whaling expeditions, the trying-out was done aboard the ship in a furnace known as a trywork and the carcass was then discarded into the water.

Baleen whales were a major source of whale oil. Their oil is exclusively composed of triglycerides, whereas that of toothed whales contains wax esters. The bowhead whale and right whale were considered the ideal whaling targets. They are slow and docile, and they float when killed. They yield plenty of high-quality oil and whalebone, and as a result, they were hunted nearly to extinction.

Chemistry

Whale oil has low viscosity (lower than olive oil), is clear, and varies in color from a bright honey yellow to a dark brown, according to the condition of the blubber from which it has been extracted and the refinement through which it went. It has a strong fishy odor. When hydrogenated, it turns solid and white and its taste and odor change. Its composition varies with the species from which it was sourced and the method by which it was harvested and processed. It is composed mainly of triglycerides (molecules of fatty acids attached to a glycerol molecule). Oil sourced from toothed whales, especially the oil of sperm whales, contains a substantial amount of wax esters. Most of the fatty acids are unsaturated. The most common fatty acids are oleic acid and its isomers (18:1 carbon chains). Whale oil is exceptionally stable.

Applications

The main use of whale oil was for illumination and machine lubrication. Cheaper alternatives to whale oil existed, but were inferior in performance and cleanliness of burn. As a result, whale oil dominated the world for both uses. This in turn further fueled the Industrial Revolution, in the United States, in Britain, and continental Europe. As demand for whale oil increased at the end of the 18th century, the whaling industry expanded until its peak around the 1820s. Due to dwindling whale populations causing higher voyage costs, as well as taxation, the market changed rapidly in the 1860s after the discovery of mineral oils and expansion of chemical refineries to produce kerosene and lubricants. By 1870, kerosene became the dominant illumination fuel and the whaling industry was in decline.

The use of whale oil had a steady decline starting in the late 19th century due to the development of superior alternatives, and later, the passing of environmental laws. In 1986, the International Whaling Commission declared a moratorium on commercial whaling, which has all but eliminated the use of whale oil today. Aboriginal whaling, part of the subsistence economy, is still permitted. Groups such as the Inuit of North America are granted special whaling rights, integral to their culture, and they still use whale oil as a food and as lamp oil in the ceremonial qulliq.

Whale oil was used as a cheap illuminant, though it gave off a strong odor when burnt and was not very popular. It was replaced in the late 19th century by cheaper, more efficient, and longer-lasting kerosene. Burning fluid known as camphine was the dominant replacement for whale oil until the arrival of kerosene.

In the United States, whale oil was used in cars as a constituent of automatic transmission fluid until it was banned by the Endangered Species Act of 1973. It was also a major component of hydraulic fluid in tractors (like the ubiquitous JDM Type 303 Special Hydraulic Fluid) until its withdrawal in 1974.

In the United Kingdom, whale oil was used in toolmaking machinery as a high-quality lubricant.

After the invention of hydrogenation in the early 20th century, whale oil was used to make margarine, a practice that has since been discontinued. Whale oil in margarine has been replaced by vegetable oil.

Whale oil was used to make soap. Until the invention of hydrogenation, it was used only in industrial-grade cleansers, because its foul smell and tendency to discolor made it unsuitable for cosmetic soap.

Whale oil was widely used in the First World War as a preventive measure against trench foot. An infantry battalion of the British Army during World War I on the Western Front could be expected to use  of whale oil a day. The oil was rubbed directly onto bare feet in order to protect them from the effects of immersion.

Gallery

In literature, fiction, and memoirs
The pursuit and use of whale oil, along with many other aspects of whaling, are discussed in Herman Melville's 1851 novel, Moby-Dick. In the novel, the fictional narrator is sometimes quoted as saying that whale oil is "as rare as the milk of queens." Which is said to emphasize the preciousness of the substance to contemporary American society. However, the actual quote is:

According to the rest of the paragraph, sailors onboard the merchantman had to sleep, dress, and maneuver below decks in the dark as opposed to the whalers who used the oil for light.

John R. Jewitt, an Englishman who wrote a memoir about his years as a captive of the Nuu-chah-nulth (Nootka), a group of Indigenous Pacific northwest peoples on the British Columbia Coast, in 1802–1805, describes how whale oil was used as a condiment with every dish, even strawberries.

In Robert Browning's Pied Piper (§ VII), the Piper's piping leads the rats to imagine the sound of "breaking the hoops of train-oil flasks". 

Friedrich Ratzel in The History of Mankind (1896), when discussing food materials in Oceania, quoted Captain James Cook's comment in relation to "the Maoris" saying "No Greenlander was ever so sharp set upon train-oil as our friends here, they greedily swallowed the stinking droppings when we were boiling down the fat of dog-fish."

See also

Oleochemistry
Rendering (animal products)
Spermaceti
Sperm whaling

References

Further reading
Whale oil and its uses, an overview with illustrations

, Includes descriptions, photographs and statistics.

How Capitalism Saved the Whales, by James S. Robbins

External links
 

Animal fats
Animal fat products
Animal products
Biofuels
Whale products
Lighting